Molos (meaning “Jetty”) is a town and a former municipality in Phthiotis, Greece. Since the 2011 local government reform it has been a part of the municipality Kamena Vourla, of which it is a municipal unit. The municipal unit has an area of 147.510 km2 and a population 4,179 in 2011).

References

External links
 Municipality of Molos 

Populated places in Phthiotis